James Hickie (1915–1973) was a Scottish footballer who played as a left back. In a professional career badly affected by World War II, prior to the conflict he won the Scottish Cup with Clyde in 1939 and was selected for the Scottish Football League XI. During wartime he turned out for Clyde, St Mirren and Dumbarton in unofficial competitions, and at its end he accepted an invitation from William Reaside to play in Mexico for a year, alongside Jackie Milne and Tom McKillop, before returning to Scotland where he played briefly for Dunfermline Athletic.

His Scottish Cup medal was stolen from his son's home in a 1992 housebreaking but later appeared for sale at auction, and was subsequently returned to the family.

References

1915 births
1973 deaths
Date of birth unknown
Date of death unknown
Scottish footballers
Sportspeople from Larkhall
Footballers from South Lanarkshire
Association football defenders
Clyde F.C. players
Larkhall Thistle F.C. players
Burnbank Athletic F.C. players
Dumbarton F.C. wartime guest players
Dunfermline Athletic F.C. players
Scottish Football League players
Scottish Football League representative players
Scottish expatriate footballers
Scottish expatriate sportspeople in Mexico
Expatriate footballers in Mexico
Liga MX players
Asturias F.C. players
St Mirren F.C. wartime guest players